Danny Choo (born 1 November 1972) is an English-born Malaysian Chinese pop culture blogger and TV personality based in Japan. He is the owner of Mirai Inc. and is best known for his virtual mascot, Mirai Suenaga. He runs a blog in which he posts content about his life, focusing on his company and his experiences in Japan. He released his own line of fashion dolls in 2014. Danny is the son of fashion designer Jimmy Choo.

Culture Japan

Danny Choo is the director, producer, and the host of a Japanese TV show called Culture Japan. The show consists of Choo personally exploring several aspects of Japanese popular culture. Segments are usually hosted by Choo interviewing a member of a specific culture that the episode is exploring. Other segments are long videos that are narrated by Mirai Suenaga (voiced by UTACO), Culture Japan's virtual mascot. The second season featured a new animated opening, Sukirai, composed by vividblaze and sung by UTACO. The video itself was animated by JC Staff. In Japan, the show is broadcast on Tokyo MX TV.

Choo has stated that the main purpose of the show is to distribute knowledge of Japanese culture to the rest of the world, although it has received some attention in Japan.

Smart Doll
Danny Choo started selling his own fashion doll known as Smart Doll. Smart Doll is a range of 1/3 scale, vinyl fashion dolls. The dolls are approximately 60 cm in height. The current design line-up consists of all his mascot characters; doll parts and accessories are also available. His dolls feature a unique assembly where the parting line is under the bust, unlike the mid-waist parting line of traditional doll design; this gives his dolls a more human-like appearance. His first doll, Mirai Suenaga, became the mascot for Japanese Tourism in 2014. 

Smart Doll is available in four skin types: Cocoa, Tan, Cinnamon, and Milk, and feature interchangeable busts, hands, feet for flat-soled and high-heeled shoes, eyes, and wigs of various colors and lengths, all of which are manufactured exclusively in Japan. Smart Doll also has two dolls with port-wine stain facial birthmarks and one doll with Vitiligo. Smart Doll’s design and business philosophy centers around wabi-sabi, a set of Japanese design principles that celebrate imperfection and asymmetry. Their intricately designed and weathered clothing showcase this design characteristic. 

In 2019, Smart Doll released an additional body type made of a harder substance called Cortex, which is sturdier, resists staining from dark-colored apparel and is less-expensive than vinyl. Cortex body was discontinued shortly after production, due to imperfections.

While the original Smart Doll’s faces are created in the Japanese Anime/Manga aesthetic, the company is in the process of releasing additional dolls referred to as “Semi-Real” which resemble more lifelike characters from video and computer games. Additionally, Smart Doll has partnered with Warner Bros. Consumer Products to create a line of DC Comics heroes and heroines which will also be created in the Japanese Anime/Manga aesthetic.

In 2015 Choo brought the dolls to Anime Expo. In 2016 Choo's Smart Dolls were showcased in Penang Fashion Week. Choo has even begun to develop 120 cm robotic dolls.

See also
 Fakku

References

External links

 
 
 

1972 births
Living people
Malaysian people of Chinese descent
People from London
Malaysian bloggers
Malaysian television personalities
Malaysian expatriates in Japan